Soaking may refer to:

 Steeping
 Bathing
 Soaking (sexual practice)
 A preparatory operation for tanning in the production of leather
 A discontinued practice to put out a runner in baseball by hitting the runner with a ball thrown by a fielder (see Origins of baseball)

See also
 Soak (disambiguation)
 Soaked (disambiguation)